"A-O-K" is a song by American singer Tai Verdes. It was released on June 8, 2021, as the fifth single from his debut studio album TV via Arista Records. The song was written by Adam Friedman, Brian William Brundage, Martijn Tienus Konijnenburg and Tai Verdes, and produced by Friedman. A remix featuring guest vocals from fellow American rapper 24kGoldn was released on September 10, 2021.

Background
In a press release, Verdes explained "A-O-K' is just a song for anyone who wants to feel 2% better. I made it to help myself, and I hope that it's helping other people when they listen to it." He also expressed to The Music Network that the song "provide[s] an uplifting message for listeners throughout the COVID-19 pandemic."

Music video
The song received two music video releases. The original version was released on May 19, 2021. The remix version with 24kGoldn was released on September 14, 2021, and directed by Logan Meis. In a backyard party, 24kGoldn and Verdes showcase their "eclectic styles and mischievous sense of humour reign free in a laid-back Sunday style". It includes "lemonade stands, pugs and flamingos."

Charts

Weekly charts

Year-end charts

Certifications

Release history

References

2021 singles
2021 songs
Tai Verdes songs
24kGoldn songs
Arista Records singles
Roots rock songs
American rock songs
Songs written by 24kGoldn